Falsehood (2001) is a short film written and directed by Kenneth Lui  starring Anne Welles, Mark Irvingsen, Marie-Noelle Marquis and Stuart Proffitt.  Its style is a highly visual fusion of film noir against classic fairy tale motifs.  It is written in the style of a courtroom drama with neo-noir elements.

Story
The film opens on an idyllic pasture where a young Bo Peep awakens from an ill-timed nap to find her sheep missing. After searching for her sheep with no luck, she finds bloody wool remains and believes that The Big Bad Wolf has eaten her flock. Years later, the grown up Bo Peep (Anne Welles) is working as a public defense attorney and confronts her own prejudice when she's assigned to defend The Big Bad Wolf (Mark Irvingsen) in the infamous Red Riding Hood (Marie-Noelle Marquis) rape trial.

In the tradition of fables, the film makes use of the interactions between humans and imaginary characters to explore themes of racial discrimination and hypocrisy set in a dark fairy tale world.

Cast
 Anne Welles as Little Bo Peep
 Mark Irvingsen as The Big Bad Wolf
 Marie-Noelle Marquis as Little Red Riding Hood
 Stuart Proffitt as The Hunter
 Barbara Scolaro as Storybook Hand
 Troy Barron as Bailiff
 Timothy Brennen as The Prosecutor
 Erynn Dana Dalton as Rapunzel
 Allison Ehly as Young Little Bo Peep
 Kim Farris as The Cat
 Zachary Hahn as The Judge
 Adrian Hasenmayer as Reporter
 Nancy Hasenmayer as Grandma
 Cathy King as Cinderella
 Mike Kruzel as Bailiff
 Thomas Mounkes as Bailiff
 Ariadne Shaffer as Snow White Charming

Festivals and awards

Other Showings

KCET Fine Cut
On August 16, 2002 the Sixth season of KCETs “Fine Cut – A Festival of Student Film” program aired Falsehood.  Before the film began, a warning was issued for adult content, in reference to its coarse language, violence, and sexual content.  An interview with writer/director Kenneth Lui was aired after the film.

Web series
In 2011, Falsehood was re-released as a web series on StayTunedTV and blip.tv.  As a web series, Falsehood was nominated by StayTunedTV for five awards:  Best Drama, Best Actor in a Drama (Mark Irvingsen), Best Actress in a Drama (Anne Welles), Best Director (Kenneth Lui), and Best Writer (Kenneth Lui).  It was awarded the Best Director award at the StayTunedTV/ITVFest Awards 2011.

References

External links 
 
 Falsehood, blip.tv

2001 films
American short films
2001 fantasy films
American neo-noir films
2000s English-language films
2000s American films